Carlos Fondacaro (born 21 May 1987 in Rosario, Argentina) is an Argentine footballer who is currently playing for Tiro Federal in the Torneo Argentino A.

Career
Fonadacaro has played in the Argentine Primera División for Boca Juniors and Club Atlético Tigre.

References

1987 births
Living people
Argentine footballers
Argentine expatriate footballers
Veikkausliiga players
FF Jaro players
Boca Juniors footballers
Club Atlético Tigre footballers
Iraklis Thessaloniki F.C. players
Tiro Federal footballers
Expatriate footballers in Greece
Expatriate footballers in Finland
Association football midfielders
Association football defenders
Footballers from Rosario, Santa Fe